Palghar is the municipal council in Palghar district, Maharashtra.

History
The Palghar municipal council established in 1999.

Municipal Council election

Electoral performance March 2019

References 

Municipal councils in Maharashtra
Palghar district